The 2008–09 season of the Slovak First League (also known as 1. liga) is the ninth season of the league since its establishment. It began in late July 2008 and ended in June 2009.

Team changes from 2007–08
Promoted in Corgoň Liga: ↑Prešov↑
Relegated from Corgoň Liga: ↓Trenčín↓
Promoted in 1. liga: ↑Dunajská Streda↑, ↑Ružomberok↑
Relegated from 1. liga: ↓Trebišov↓, ↓Stará Ľubovňa↓

Stadia and locations

League table

Top goalscorers

See also
2008–09 Slovak Superliga

References

External links
 Slovak FA official site 

2. Liga (Slovakia) seasons
2
Slovak